White Mound Township is a township in Jewell County, Kansas, USA.  As of the 2000 census, its population was 49.

Geography
White Mound Township covers an area of 35.78 square miles (92.66 square kilometers); of this, 0.04 square miles (0.11 square kilometers) or 0.12 percent is water. The streams of Ash Creek, Ayres Creek, North Branch White Rock Creek and Smith Creek run through this township.

Adjacent townships
 Highland Township (north)
 Walnut Township (northeast)
 Burr Oak Township (east)
 Limestone Township (southeast)
 Esbon Township (south)
 Oak Township, Smith County (southwest)
 White Rock Township, Smith County (west)
 Logan Township, Smith County (northwest)

Cemeteries
The township contains three cemeteries: Oak Creek, Providence and Salem.

References
 U.S. Board on Geographic Names (GNIS)
 United States Census Bureau cartographic boundary files

External links
 US-Counties.com
 City-Data.com

Townships in Jewell County, Kansas
Townships in Kansas